George Briant (1828 – 10 May 1914) was an Australian cricketer. He played one first-class match for Tasmania in 1858.

See also
 List of Tasmanian representative cricketers

References

External links
 

1828 births
1914 deaths
Australian cricketers
Tasmania cricketers
People from Hackney Central
Cricketers from Greater London